Altdorf, a compound word in German consisting of old and village, may refer to:

France
Altdorf, Bas-Rhin

Germany
Altdorf bei Nürnberg, a city in Bavaria
Altdorf, Lower Bavaria, a municipality in Landshut, Bavaria
Altdorf, Böblingen
Altdorf, Esslingen
Altdorf, Rhineland-Palatinate, a municipality in Südliche Weinstraße
Weingarten (Württemberg), formerly Altdorf

Switzerland
Altdorf, Jura or Bassecourt
Altdorf, Schaffhausen
Altdorf, Uri

Poland (German name)
Stara Wieś, Pszczyna
Stara Wieś, Silesian Voivodeship

United States
Altdorf, Wisconsin

Other uses
Altdorf (Warhammer), the capital of the Empire in the universe of Warhammer Fantasy
University of Altdorf, a former university in Altdorf bei Nürnberg, Germany

See also
Altendorf (disambiguation)